Kõrvetaguse is a village in Märjamaa Parish, Rapla County in northwestern Estonia. Between 1991–2017 (until the administrative reform of Estonian municipalities) the village was located in Raikküla Parish.

References

 

Villages in Rapla County
Kreis Wiek